Narkan (also Romanized as Nārḵan) is a village in Howmeh Rural District, in the Central District of Semnan County, Semnan Province, Iran. At the 2006 census, its population was 31, in five families.

See also

References 

Populated places in Semnan County